Consolación del Sur Municipal Museum is a museum located in the 62nd street in Consolación del Sur, Cuba. It was established as a museum on 14 December 1979.

The museum holds 10 sections (numismatics, sports, history, arts, documents among others). Currently, it is closed.

See also 
 List of museums in Cuba

References 

Museums in Cuba
Museum
Buildings and structures in Pinar del Río Province
Museums established in 1979
1979 establishments in Cuba
20th-century architecture in Cuba